Lisa C. Richardson is an American physician who is the Director of CDC Division of Cancer Prevention and Control. She is responsible for the Colorectal Cancer Control Program, the National Breast and Cervical Cancer Early Detection Program, the National Comprehensive Cancer Control Program, and the National Program of Cancer Registries.

Early life and education 
Richardson earned her bachelor's and medical degrees at the University of North Carolina at Chapel Hill and Howard University. Whilst at UNC, she was inducted into the Alpha Omega Alpha honor society. She moved to the University of Michigan School of Public Health for graduate studies, where she earned a master's degree in public health. Richardson was an oncology fellow at the University of Florida College of Medicine.

Research and career 
In 1997, Richardson joined the Centers for Disease Control and Prevention (CDC). She was appointed medical director of the CDC National Breast and Cervical Cancer Early Detection Programme. The initiative provided cancer screening for low income, uninsured women. In 1998, she was made medical director of the CDC blood disorder division. In this capacity she evaluated HIV and hepatitis infections amongst people with haemophilia. She joined the faculty at the University of Florida in 2000, where she spent four years before returning to the CDC. She was appointed to the Division of Cancer Prevention and Control in 2010, where she oversees a $380 million annual budget.

Richardson serves on the faculty at the University of Southern California, where she specializes in trans-care and eating disorders in athletes.

Selected publications

References 

21st-century American women physicians
21st-century American physicians
Living people
Centers for Disease Control and Prevention people
Year of birth missing (living people)
University of North Carolina at Chapel Hill alumni
University of Michigan School of Public Health alumni